The 1974 Philippine Championships was a men's tennis tournament played on outdoor clay courts in Manila, the Philippines. It was the second edition of the event and was held from 11 November through 17 November 1974. The tournament was part of the Group B tier of the Grand Prix tennis circuit. Ismail El Shafei won the singles title.

Finals

Singles
 Ismail El Shafei defeated  Hans-Jürgen Pohmann 7–6, 6–1
 It was El Shafei's 2nd  singles title of the year and the 6th of his career.

Doubles
 Syd Ball /  Ross Case defeated  Mike Estep /  Marcello Lara 6–3, 6–7, 9–7

References

External links
 International Tennis Federation (ITF) tournament edition details

Milo International Tennis Classic
1974 in Philippine sport
Sports in Manila